Conundrum Press is a book publishing company founded in 1998 in Crested Butte, Colorado by David J. Rothman.  

It focuses on poetry of the American West, especially Colorado.  Although its platform is regional, it has attracted a number of nationally and internationally known writers and its books have won several awards.  Conundrum has published books by Burton Raffel, James Tipton (with a Foreword by Isabel Allende), Mark Todd (with a Foreword by Dana Gioia), Zsolt, and others.

External links

Book publishing companies based in Colorado
Publishing companies established in 1998
Gunnison County, Colorado
1998 establishments in Colorado